Luis Alfredo Fratti Silveira (born 1956) is a Uruguayan politician and veterinarian of the Movement of Popular Participation – Broad Front, serving as National Representative for Cerro Largo Department since 15 February 2015. He served as president of the Chamber of Representatives from 1 March 2021 to 1 March 2022.

Fratti was a deputy between 2005 and 2010. During the government of José Mujica he was director of the National Meat Institute.

References 

Living people
1956 births
Presidents of the Chamber of Representatives of Uruguay
Broad Front (Uruguay) politicians
Movement of Popular Participation politicians
Members of the Chamber of Representatives of Uruguay